Dyakov is a rural locality (a khutor) in Kirovskoye Rural Settlement of Maykopsky District, Russia. The population was 149 as of 2018. There are 2 streets.

Geography 
Dyakov is located 19 km north of Tulsky (the district's administrative centre) by road. Grazhdansky is the nearest rural locality.

References 

Rural localities in Maykopsky District